Holes in the Wall is the debut studio album by The Electric Soft Parade, released on 4 February 2002. The album was released by db Records and was nominated for the Mercury Music Prize. The album features a wide array of sounds, ranging from hard-edged guitar rock (namely "Start Again" and "Why Do You Try So Hard to Hate Me"), anthemic pop (the epic "Silent to the Dark"), and somber acoustic tracks like "It's Wasting Me Away".

Singles
In the UK, there were several singles released. Prior to the album's release, the band issued the double A-side singles "Silent to the Dark"/"Something's Got to Give" on 30 April 2001, "Empty at the End"/"Sumatran" on 23 July 2001, and "There's a Silence" (with the B-sides "On the Wires" and "Broadcast") on 29 October 2001. "There's a Silence" reached number 52 on the UK Singles Chart.

After the album's release, a new version of "Silent to the Dark" (entitled "Silent to the Dark II" and mixed by Danton Supple) was released on 4 March 2002, and reached number 23 on the UK Singles Chart. Another double A-side single, "Empty at the End"/"This Given Line", was released on 20 May 2002 and charted at number 39 in the UK. The album's final single, "Biting the Soles of My Feet" (titled on the single as "Same Way, Every Day (Biting the Soles of My Feet)"), was released on 30 September 2002 and did not chart in the UK.

Reception

Upon its release, Holes in the Wall received some critical acclaim. At Metacritic, which assigns a weighted average score out of 100 to reviews and ratings from mainstream critics, the album has received a metascore of 73, based on 9 reviews, indicating "generally favorable reviews." AllMusic reviewer Lee Meyer awarded the album four out of five stars, and stated that "one of the album's greatest virtues is its memorable melodies, as exemplified in the catchy choruses of songs like 'Empty at the End' and 'Silent to the Dark'." Meyer further hailed, "The White brothers also have ear-catching production on their side, giving their album true flavor by infusing it with splashes of electronics and keyboards, psychedelic swirl, and the occasional irregular time signature."

Track listings

Vinyl track listing
SIDE A
 "This Given Line" – 4:12
 "Empty at the End" – 3:01
 "Something's Got to Give" – 3:49
 "There's a Silence" – 2:52

SIDE B
 "It's Wasting Me Away" – 4:17
 "Silent to the Dark" – 9:00

SIDE C
 "Sleep Alone" – 4:09
 "Why Do You Try So Hard to Hate Me" – 4:38
 "Holes in the Wall" – 5:14

SIDE D
 "Biting the Soles of My Feet" – 6:25
 "Red Balloon for Me" – 4:12

Personnel
Musicians
Tom White – vocals, guitar, bass, drums, drum machine, synthesizer, piano, violin
Alex White – vocals, guitar, bass, drum machine, synthesizer, piano
Chris Hughes – occasional percussion
Mark Frith – bass (tracks 3 and 11), shaker (track 10)
Cliff Jones – backing vocals (track 12)

Production and technical
Produced by The Electric Soft Parade, Chris Hughes, and Mark Frith
Recorded by Mark Frith
Tracks 6 and 12 recorded by Tom White and Mark Frith
Mixed by Tim Oliver (tracks 2, 4 to 7, and 9 to 12), Danton Supple (tracks 1, 8, and 9), and Mark Frith (tracks 1, 2, 3, and 8)
Centre and back cover photography by Steve Gullick
Photo collage by Tom White

References

2002 debut albums
Albums produced by Chris Hughes (musician)
The Electric Soft Parade albums